Stories is Chris Brokaw's third solo EP.

Background 

Released in December 2011 by Limited Appeal Records, Stories was recorded and mixed by Tim Shea in January 2011 in Boston, MA. Dean Styers was in charge of photography and provided the album's cover art. The original pressing was a small, numbered edition of 117 copies, and contained merely three tracks, the vinyl for which was cut by Bob Weston at CMS. The EP was re-released in a CD version which included three further tracks, all instrumental versions of the songs contained in the vinyl pressing. 
 
The vinyl release of the EP is single-sided, the B-side containing stencilled artwork by Dean Styers, who has in the past provided artwork for The Jesus Lizard, Aerosmith, and others.

Critical reception 

The Phoenix described Stories as "a gorgeous new EP of arid, sprawling, electric guitar-based rock."

Track listing 

All songs written and performed by Chris Brokaw.

Personnel 

 Chris Brokaw – guitars, percussion, vocals
 
 Additional personnel

 Tim Shea – Producer, Mixing
 Bob Weston – Vinyl Cutting 
 Dean Styers – Photography, Cover Design

References

External links 
 Chris Brokaw's Official Website 
 Discogs entry for Stories 
 Dean Styers' Official Website
 Limited Appeal Records website
 Chris Brokaw interview

Chris Brokaw albums
2011 EPs